These are the mammals known to occur in the Desengano State Park in the state of Rio de Janeiro in Brazil. When the exact species present is unknown, only the genus is given.

Infraclass: Eutheria

Order: Chiroptera
 Family: Vespertilionidae
 Genus: Lasiurus
 Desert red bat, Lasiurus blossevillii
 Southern yellow bat, Lasiurus ega
 Genus: Myotis
 Black myotis, Myotis nigricans
 Family: Phyllostomidae
 Genus: Anoura
 Tailed tailless bat, Anoura caudifer
 Geoffroy's tailless bat, Anoura geoffroyi
 Genus: Artibeus
 Fringed fruit-eating bat, Artibeus fimbriatus
 Great fruit-eating bat, Artibeus lituratus
 Genus: Carollia
 Seba's short-tailed bat, Carollia perspicillata
 Genus: Chrotopterus
 Big-eared woolly bat, Chrotopterus auritus
 Genus: Desmodus
 Common vampire bat, Desmodus rotundus
 Genus: Platyrrhinus
 White-lined broad-nosed bat, Platyrrhinus lineatus
 Recife broad-nosed bat, Platyrrhinus recifinus
 Genus: Sturnira
 Little yellow-shouldered bat, Sturnira lilium

Order: Primates
 Family: Pitheciidae
 Genus: Callicebus
 Atlantic titi, Callicebus personatus
 Family: Atelidae
 Genus: Alouatta
 Genus: Brachyteles
 Southern muriqui, Brachyteles arachnoides

Rodentia
 Family: Sciuridae
 Genus: Sciurus
 Ingram's squirrel, Sciurus ingrami
 Family: Cricetidae
 Genus: Akodon
Serra do Mar grass mouse, Akodon serrensis
 Genus: Cerradomys
Terraced rice rat, Cerradomys subflavus
 Genus: Delomys
Striped Atlantic Forest rat, Delomys dorsalis
Pallid Atlantic Forest rat, Delomys sublineatus
 Genus: Euryoryzomys
Russet rice rat, Euryoryzomys russatus
 Genus: Hylaeamys
Azara's broad-headed oryzomys, Hylaeamys megacephalus
 Genus: Nectomys
Scaly-footed water rat, Nectomys squamipes
 Genus: Oligoryzomys
Black-footed pygmy rice rat, Oligoryzomys nigripes
 Genus: Oxymycterus
Atlantic Forest hocicudo, Oxymycterus dasytrichus
 Genus: Rhipidomys
 Genus: Thaptomys
Blackish grass mouse, Thaptomys nigrita
 Family: Caviidae
 Genus: Cavia
 Family: Cuniculidae
 Genus: Cuniculus
 Lowland paca, Cuniculus paca
 Family: Dasyproctidae
 Genus: Dasyprocta
 Azara's agouti, Dasyprocta azarae
 Family: Erethizontidae
 Genus: Sphiggurus
 Family: Echimyidae
 Genus: Euryzygomatomys
Fischer's guiara, Euryzygomatomys spinosus'
 Genus: Trinomys Soft-spined Atlantic spiny rat, Trinomys dimidiatusOrder: Pilosa
 Family: Bradypodidae
 Genus: Bradypus Brown-throated sloth, Bradypus variegatusOrder: Cingulata
 Family: Dasypodidae
 Genus: Cabassous Greater naked-tailed armadillo, Cabassous tatouay Genus: Dasypus Nine-banded armadillo, Dasypus novemcinctus Seven-banded armadillo, Dasypus septemcinctusOrder: Carnivora
 Family: Felidae
 Genus: Leopardus Ocelot, Leopardus pardalis Oncilla, Leopardus tigrinus Margay, Leopardus wiedii Family: Procyonidae
 Genus: Nasua South American coati, Nasua nasua Genus: Procyon Crab-eating raccoon, Procyon cancrivorus Family: Mustelidae
 Genus: EiraTayra, Eira barbara Genus: LontraNeotropical river otter, Lontra longicaudisOrder: Artiodactyla
 Family: Tayassuidae
 Genus: TayassuWhite-lipped peccary, Tayassu pecariInfraclass: Metatheria

Order: Didelphimorphia
 Family: Didelphidae
 Genus: Gracilinanus Brazilian gracile opossum, Gracilinanus microtarsus Genus: Metachirus Brown four-eyed opossum, Metachirus nudicaudatus Genus: Marmosops Brazilian slender opossum, Marmosops paulensis Genus: Monodelphis Northern three-striped opossum, Monodelphis americana Genus: Didelphis Big-eared opossum, Didelphis aurita Genus: Philander Southeastern four-eyed opossum, Philander frenatus''

References
Mamíferos do Parque Estadual do Desengano, Rio de Janeiro, Brasil

Desengano State Park